Rudy is a 1993 American biographical sports film directed by David Anspaugh. It is an account of the life of Daniel "Rudy" Ruettiger, who harbored dreams of playing football at the University of Notre Dame despite significant obstacles. It was the first film that the Notre Dame administration allowed to be shot on campus since Knute Rockne, All American in 1940.

In 2005, Rudy was named one of the best 25 sports movies of the previous 25 years in two polls by ESPN (#24 by a panel of sports experts, and #4 by ESPN.com users). It was ranked the 54th-most inspiring film of all time in the American Film Institute's "100 Years" series.

The film premiered at the Toronto International Film Festival on September 18, 1993, and was released in the United States on October 15, 1993, by TriStar Pictures. It stars Sean Astin as the title character, along with Ned Beatty, Jason Miller, Robert Prosky and Charles S. Dutton. The film had supporting roles from Jon Favreau and Vince Vaughn, being both actors' first film roles. The script was written by Angelo Pizzo, who created Hoosiers (1986), which was also directed by Anspaugh.

Plot
In the late 1960s in Joliet, Illinois, Daniel Eugene "Rudy" Ruettiger dreams of playing football at Notre Dame. However, he lacks the grades and money to attend and the talent and physical stature to play major college football. Following high school, he works at a steel mill with his father, a Notre Dame fan, and his older brother. When his supportive best friend Pete is killed in a mill explosion, Rudy decides to follow his dream.

In 1972, Rudy visits Notre Dame but is not academically eligible to enroll. With the help of local priest and former Notre Dame president Father John Cavanaugh, Rudy enrolls at nearby Holy Cross College, hoping to transfer. He approaches Fortune, head groundskeeper at Notre Dame Stadium, and is given a job. Homeless, Rudy sneaks into Fortune's office through a window to sleep on a cot; initially indifferent to Rudy's plight, Fortune later leaves him with blankets and a key to the office. Rudy learns that Fortune, despite working at the stadium for years, has never seen a Notre Dame football game.

Rudy befriends teaching assistant D-Bob, who helps him study in return for Rudy's helping him socially with girls.  D-Bob tests Rudy for a learning disability; the results indicate that Rudy suffers from dyslexia, which he then overcomes to become a better student. At Christmas, Rudy returns home to find that his family appreciates his college academic achievements, although his brother Frank still mocks him for his attempts to play college football. Rudy persists, and even losing his girlfriend to his older brother Johnny does not deter him.

After two years at Holy Cross and three rejections from Notre Dame, Rudy is finally admitted and attends football tryouts in the hope of making the team as a "walk-on." Assistant coach Joe Yonto warns the walk-ons that 35 scholarship players will not even make the "dress roster" of players who take the field during games. However, he notices Rudy's determination and gives him a spot on the daily practice squad. Rudy tells Fortune and persuades him to promise to see Rudy's first game.

Playing well, Rudy convinces head coach Ara Parseghian to let him suit up for one home game in his senior year, but Parseghian retires following the 1974 season. He is replaced by former NFL coach Dan Devine, who refuses to put Rudy on the game-day roster. Frustrated by not being on the dress list for the next-to-last home game, Rudy quits the team.

Fortune finds a distraught Rudy and reveals he had actually played for Notre Dame years earlier. However, Fortune quit the team because he felt his skin color kept him from playing; he has regretted this decision ever since. Reminded that he has nothing to prove to anyone but himself and will forever regret quitting, Rudy returns to the team. Each of his fellow seniors, led by team captain and All-American Roland Steele, lines up to lay his jersey on Devine's desk. Each player requests that Rudy be allowed to dress in his place for the season's final game. Devine lets Rudy suit up against Georgia Tech.

With Rudy's family and D-Bob in attendance, Steele invites Rudy to lead the team onto the field, and Fortune is there to see the game as promised. With Notre Dame leading 17–3 in the fourth quarter, Devine sends all the seniors into the game except Rudy, despite Steele's and the assistant coaches' urging. Fans are aware of Rudy's goal from a story in the student newspaper, and a "Rudy!" chant begins in the stadium. Hearing this, the Notre Dame offense, led by tailback Jamie O'Hara, overrules Devine's call for victory formation and scores a quick touchdown. This gives defensive player Rudy a chance to get in the game and be entered onto the Fighting Irish roster. Devine finally lets Rudy play on the Notre Dame kickoff to Georgia Tech. Rudy stays in for the final play, sacks the Georgia Tech quarterback, and is carried off the field on his teammates' shoulders to cheers from the stadium.

An epilogue states that since 1975, no other Notre Dame player has been carried off the field as of the time of the film's release in 1993. Rudy graduated in 1976, and five of his younger brothers went on to earn college degrees.

Cast
Sean Astin as Daniel "Rudy" Ruettiger
Jon Favreau as Dennis "D-Bob" McGowan
Ned Beatty as Daniel Ruettiger, Sr.
Charles S. Dutton as Fortune
Robert Prosky as Father John Cavanaugh
Jason Miller as Coach Ara Parseghian
Lili Taylor as Sherry
Mitch Rouse as Jim
John Beasley as Assistant Coach Warren
Vince Vaughn as Jamie O'Hara (Credited as "Vincent Vaughn")
Scott Benjaminson as Frank
Chelcie Ross as Coach Dan Devine
Ron Dean as Assistant Coach Joe Yonto
Rudy Ruettiger – Cameo in a picture at the end of the movie, and in a crowd scene at the Georgia Tech game, behind Ned Beatty
Greta Lind as Mary
 Christopher Reed as Pete
Gerry Becker as Father Ted
Diana James as Pick-up Girl #1
Mindy Hester as Pick-up Girl #2

Soundtrack

The soundtrack to Rudy was composed and conducted by veteran composer Jerry Goldsmith. Goldsmith had previously worked with filmmakers Angelo Pizzo and David Anspaugh on their successful 1986 film Hoosiers, garnering the film an Oscar nomination for Best Original Score and thus making Goldsmith their first choice to compose a soundtrack for Rudy.

 "Main Title" (3:35)
 "A Start"(2:27)
 "Waiting" (2:35)
 "Back on the Field" (2:07)
 "To Notre Dame" (6:55)
 "Tryouts" (4:27)
 "The Key" (3:55)
 "Take Us Out" (1:51)
 "The Plaque" (2:36)
 "The Final Game" (6:16)

According to Soundtrack.net, "Tryouts" has been used in 12 trailers, including those for Angels in the Outfield, BASEketball, The Deep End of the Ocean, Good Will Hunting, The Little Vampire, Mafia!, Seabiscuit and Spirit: Stallion of the Cimarron.

In 2008, Senator John McCain used "Take Us Out" as an official anthem during his presidential run. The piece of music was played at major events such as after Senator McCain's acceptance speech to the Republican National Convention and after John McCain announced Governor Sarah Palin as his running mate in Dayton, Ohio.

"Take Us Out" was played in the pilot episode of About a Boy, based on the 2002 film of the same name.

Also recorded in the film are performances of various Notre Dame fight songs by the Notre Dame Glee Club.

Production
Ruettiger decided to sell his story in 1986 and wanted Pizzo to write a script. Pizzo initially refused as he hated Notre Dame and didn't want anything to do with them but Ruettiger managed to convince him to write it. The film was shot in Illinois and Indiana.

Historical accuracy
In reality, Coach Dan Devine had announced that Rudy would dress for the Georgia Tech game during practice a few days before. The dramatic scene in which Rudy's senior teammates laid their jerseys on Devine's desk in protest never happened. According to Ruettiger, Devine was persuaded to allow him to dress only after a number of senior players requested that he do so. Devine had agreed to be depicted as the "heavy" in the film for dramatic effect but was chagrined to find out the extent to which he was vilified, saying: "The jersey scene is unforgivable. It's a lie and untrue."

As a guest on The Dan Patrick Show on September 8, 2010, Joe Montana, who was an active member of the team when Ruettiger played in the Georgia Tech game, confirmed that the jersey scene never happened, stating: "It's a movie, remember. Not all of that is true...The crowd wasn't chanting, nobody threw in their jerseys. He did get in the ball game. He got carried off after the game."

Nearly 10 years later in an interview on Barstool Sports' Pardon My Take podcast, Montana reiterated that the jersey scene and crowd chanting did not actually occur. He also implied that carrying Ruettiger off the field was sarcastic rather than celebratory, saying: "Was there a lot of things that happened? Yeah. He got in, he got a sack. Was the crowd chanting? No. Did I throw in my jersey? No. Did he get carried off the field? He got carried off by three of the biggest pranksters on the team."

Reception
The film was the closing night gala at the 1993 Toronto International Film Festival.

Rudy received primarily positive reviews from critics. Roger Ebert of the Chicago Sun-Times wrote that the film "has a freshness and an earnestness that gets us involved, and by the end of the film we accept Rudy's dream as more than simply sports sentiment. It's a small but powerful illustration of the human spirit." Stephen Holden of The New York Times observed that "For all its patness, the movie also has a gritty realism that is not found in many higher-priced versions of the same thing, and its happy ending is not the typical Hollywood leap into fantasy." In The Washington Post, Richard Harrington called Rudy "a sweet-natured family drama in which years of effort are rewarded by a brief moment of glory." Kenneth Turan of the Los Angeles Times called the film "Sweet-natured and unsurprising...this is one of those Never Say Die, I Gotta Be Me, Somebody Up There Likes Me sports movies that no amount of cynicism can make much of a dent in." On Rotten Tomatoes, the film holds a rating of 78%, based on 46 reviews, with an average rating of 6.9/10. The site's consensus reads, "Though undeniably sentimental and predictable, Rudy succeeds with an uplifting spirit and determination." Metacritic gave the film a score of 71, based on 22 reviews, indicating "generally favorable reviews".

In 2006, AFI placed the film on its 100 Years...100 Cheers list, where it was ranked #54.

Home media
Rudy was released on VHS by Columbia TriStar Home Video on May 25, 1994, and on LaserDisc on June 22, 1994. The film was released as a Special Edition DVD on September 26, 2000. The film was released on Blu-Ray for the first time on September 9, 2008.

References

Notes

External links

 
 
 
 

1990s biographical drama films
1993 drama films
1993 films
American biographical drama films
American football films
Biographical films about sportspeople
Cultural depictions of American men
Cultural depictions of players of American football
Films about the education system in the United States
Films about disability in the United States
Films directed by David Anspaugh
Films scored by Jerry Goldsmith
Films set in 1975
Films set in Illinois
Films set in Indiana
Films set in the 1970s
Films set in universities and colleges
Films shot in Illinois
Films shot in Indiana
Notre Dame Fighting Irish football
Sports films based on actual events
TriStar Pictures films
1990s English-language films
1990s American films